Sibylle of Bavaria (16 June 1489 – 18 April 1519 in Heidelberg) was a member of the House of Wittelsbach was a princess of Bavaria-Munich and by marriage Electress Palatine.

Life 
Sibylle was the daughter of Duke Albert IV of Bavaria-Munich (1447–1508) from his marriage to Kunigunde of Austria (1465–1520), daughter of Holy Roman Emperor Frederick III.  She married on 23 February 1511 in Heidelberg Elector Palatine Louis V (1478–1544).  The couple had no children.

Louis had earlier been engaged to Sibylle's elder sister Sidonie, but Sidonie had died before she could marry, barely 17 years old. The marriage was the starting point of the relaxation of the relations between Bavaria and the Palatinate, which were severely impacted by the Landshut War of Succession. Relationships between the Palatinate and Emperor Maximilian I, who was Sibylle's uncle, also improved and Louis came closer politically to the Contra League.

Sibylle died in 1519 and was buried in the Church of the Holy Spirit in Heidelberg.  For a while, Sibylle's inheritance was claimed by her brother Ernest.  This claim was denied by her widower and her brother William.  Instead, Ernest was promised a high ecclesiastic office.

References

Footnotes 

House of Wittelsbach
Bavarian nobility
1489 births
1519 deaths
Women of medieval Bavaria
15th-century German women
15th-century German people
16th-century German women
16th-century German people
Burials at the Church of the Holy Spirit, Heidelberg
Daughters of monarchs
Electresses of the Palatinate